The Librarian may refer to:
The Librarian (Discworld), a character from the Discworld novels
The Librarian (franchise), a series of made-for-TV movies starring Noah Wyle
The Librarian: Quest for the Spear, a 2004 made-for-TV movie
The Librarian: Return to King Solomon's Mines, a 2006 made-for-TV movie, sequel to Quest for the Spear
The Librarian: Curse of the Judas Chalice, a 2008 made-for-TV movie, sequel to Return to King Solomon's Mines
The Librarians (2014 TV series), a 2014 television series that is a direct spin-off of The Librarian film series
The Librarian (novel), 2018 novel by Salley Vickers
The Librarian (painting), 1566 painting by Giuseppe Arcimboldo
The Librarian, a version control system made by Applied Data Research

See also 
 Librarian
 The Librarians (disambiguation)